Michael Shannon (born 1974) is an American actor and musician.

Michael Shannon may also refer to:

 Michael J. Shannon (born 1943), American actor
 Michael Shannon (pediatrician) (c. 1953–2009), American pediatric toxicologist
 Mike Shannon (born 1939), American baseball player and sportscaster
 The Strangers with Mike Shannon, 1960s South African pop group